Cicatrices del alma (English title:Scars of the soul) is a Mexican telenovela produced by  Eugenio Cobo for Televisa in 1986. It is an original story by Lindy Giacoman and adapted by Eric Vonn and Liliana Abud. It starred Norma Herrera, Germán Robles, Gregorio Casal, Rebeca Rambal and José Elías Moreno.

Plot
Elvira is an unhappy woman who has endured for years mistreatment and humiliation of her cruel husband Octavio, in addition to suffering the contempt of his ungrateful children Lucila and Alfredo. This has meant that over time Elvira has become weak and insecure woman. But life will give a new opportunity for women to be happy when you receive a large inheritance and open the doors to a new love.

Cast 
 
Norma Herrera as Elvira Contreras de Rivas Castilla
Germán Robles as Imanol Fonseca de Landeros
Gregorio Casal as Octavio Rivas Castilla Albanera
Rebeca Rambal as Lucila Rivas Castilla Contreras
José Elías Moreno as Alfredo Rivas Castilla Contreras
Delia Casanova as Blanca Andrade Mendoza
Juan Carlos Serrán as Sandro Valencia Ordoñez
Magda Karina as Graciela
Lucero Lander as Susana
Luis Couturier as Federico
Edgardo Gazcón as Francisco
América Gabriel as Inés
Socorro Bonilla as Sister Refugio
Héctor Ortega as Father René
Susana Kamini as Eleonora
Rosario Gálvez as Pastora
Beatriz Moreno as Panchita
Abraham Stavans as Ramiro
Iliana Ilisecas as Martha
Ari Telch as Samuel
Jaime Lozano as Martín
Carmen Cortés as Rosa
Rafael del Villar as Marco
Rosa María Morales as Bertha
Lilia Sixtos as María
Irlanda Mora as Montserrat
Azucena Rodríguez as Mother Superior
Mario Alberto León as Pedro
Antonio Farré as Darío
Isaura Espinoza as Diana
Elizabeth Dupeyrón as María José
Aurora Molina as Dolores
Armando Calvo as Don Paco
Úrsula Álvarez as Natalia
Antonio Farré as David
Alda Rolán as Pilar
Miguel Rodarte as Javier
Susana Kamini as Eleonora
Ricardo Cervantes

Awards

References

External links

1986 telenovelas
Mexican telenovelas
1986 Mexican television series debuts
1987 Mexican television series endings
Spanish-language telenovelas
Television shows set in Mexico City
Televisa telenovelas